Qanqanlu (also Romanized as Qānqānlū and Ghanghanloo; also known as Kānglū) is a village in Hesar-e Valiyeasr Rural District, Central District, Avaj County, Qazvin Province, Iran. At the 2006 census, its population was 277, in 61 families.

References 

Populated places in Avaj County